Derrynane are a Gaelic Athletic Association club from County Kerry, Ireland. The club is a member of the South Kerry division of Kerry GAA. The club fields teams in Gaelic football only, as no hurling is played in that region. It is a participant in the South Kerry Senior Football Championship.

Honors
 South Kerry Senior Football Championships (1): 1936

Most Expensive Transfer : Jamie Donnelly . Derrynane>>Waterville €300

References

Gaelic football clubs in County Kerry
Gaelic games clubs in County Kerry